Emre 

 Emre Altuğ (born 1970), Turkish musician
 
 Emre Aracı (born 1968), Turkish music historian, conductor, composer
 Emre Aydın (born 1981), Turkish rock singer
 Emre Aşık (born 1973), Turkish footballer
 Emre Zafer Barnes (born 1988), Jamaican-Turkish sprinter
 Emre Bayav (born 1987), Turkish basketball player
 Emre Belözoğlu (born 1980), Turkish footballer
 Emre Can (born 1994), German-Turkish footballer
 Emre Can (chess player) (born 1990), Turkish Grandmaster chess player
 Emre Çolak (born 1991), Turkish footballer
 Emre Elivar (born 1976), Turkish concert pianist
 Emre Gönensay (born 1937), Turkish politician
 Emre Güngör (born 1984), Turkish footballer
 Emre Güral (born 1989), Turkish footballer
 Emre Gürbüz (born 1991), Turkish footballer
 Emre İşçiler (born 1989), Turkish footballer
 Emre Kartari, Turkish jazz percussionist
 Emre Kongar (born 1941), Turkish social scientist, writer and author
 Emre Korkmaz (born 1986), Turkish actor
 Emre Kızılkaya (born 1982), Turkish journalist
 Emre Miyasoğlu (born 1981), Turkish writer
 Emre Nefiz (born 1994), Turkish footballer
 Emre Ozdemir (born 1981), Turkish editorial cartoonist and illustrator
 Emre Özkan (born 1988), Turkish footballer
 Emre Öztürk (footballer) (born 1986), German footballer
 Emre Sabuncuoğlu (born 1976), Turkish classical guitarist
 Emre Sahin, Turkish director
 Emre Şimşek (born 1987), Turkish alpine skier
 Emre Taner (born 1942), Turkish civil servant
 Emre Torun (born 1993), Turkish footballer
 Emre Ünver (born 1981), Dutch politician
 Emre Vefa Göktaş (born 2001), Turkish karateka
 Emre Yüksektepe (born 1991), Turkish footballer
 Yusuf Emre Fırat (born 2000), Turkish cross-country skier
 Fictional characters
 Emre Ogan, a character in The Promise (2016)

See also
 Emre (surname)

Turkish masculine given names